Mian Ghaus Khan (died 1814), also known as Mian Ghausa, was a Punjabi Muslim of Arain descent who served as an artillery officer of the Sukerchakia Misl under Sardar Maha Singh. After Maha Singh's death, Ghaus Khan served his son, Ranjit Singh, the founder of the Sikh Empire. Ghaus Khan's son, Sultan Mahmud Khan (d. 1859) and grandson, Sultan Ahmad Ali Khan, too served in the Sikh Khalsa Army.

Military career 
Ghaus Khan enrolled in the army of Maha Singh and eventually rose to become his Jarnail (General). His first significant participation was during the conquest of the Rohtas Fort from Nur-ud-din Bamezai, a general of Ahmad Shah Durrani. He accompanied Maha Singh during four-month siege to Rasool Nagar, in which they were assisted by Jai Singh Kanhaiya, chief of the Kanhaiya Misl. He served under the 10-year old Ranjit Singh during the siege of Sodhra. Sometime after, Maha Singh died and Ranjit Singh was crowned the chief of Sukerchakia Misl.

Under Ranjit Singh, he served during the Battle of Amritsar (1797), Battle of Gujrat (1797) and Battle of Amritsar (1798), these battled foiled the attempts of Shah Zaman Durrani to annex Punjab into his region. In 1799, he accompanied Ranjit Singh and his mother-in-law, Sada Kaur in the conquest of Lahore from the Bhangi Misl. In 1801, Ranjit Singh was proclaimed the Maharaja of Punjab.

Ghaus Khan was skilful artillery officer and known to be close to both Maha Singh and Ranjit Singh. He was rewarded with jagirs of Van and Bharoval in Amritsar district, along with a mansion in Lahore. In 1808, he commanded the operation with the six-year old Prince Kharak Singh, when he was sent to capture the fort of Sheikhupura. In 1812, when Ranjit Singh reorganized the artillery wing of his army into Topkhana Khas and Topkhana Mubarak, Jarnail Ghaus Khan was placed in charge of both, with the designation of Daroghai Topkhana.

References 

1814 deaths
19th-century Indian Muslims
People from Gujranwala
Military personnel from Lahore
People of the Sikh Empire
Rajputs
Indian warriors
Indian generals